Sohan is a traditional Persian saffron brittle toffee made in Iran. Its ingredients consist of wheat sprout, flour, egg yolks, rose water, sugar, butter or vegetable oil, saffron, cardamom, and slivers of almond and pistachio.

Sohan is originated in Qom, Iran.There are different types of Sohan including Honey Sohan, Sesame Sohan, Sohan Halwa, Almond Sohan, Sohan Gazi, Sohan Loghmeh, Butter Sohan, Sohan Pashmaki (cotton candy) and Dessert Sohan. Some people believe that when Mozaffar ad-Din Shah Qajar travelled to Qom and he was entertained with Halwa Qomi, he analogized it to a rasp (Sohan is the Persian word meaning rasp or file) which digested the food he had eaten very well.

See also
 Sohan papdi
 Shekarpareh
 Sohan halwa
 Sohan asali
 Peanut brittle
 Florentine biscuit

References

:232

:232

Confectionery
Iranian desserts
Cookies
Isfahan
Qom Province